Wide Open Space (WOS) is a music, arts and culture festival in  Central Australia, in the Northern Territory. It has taken place annually from 2009 to 2018, and then in 2021. Around 1500 people attend the festival each time.

The festival is known for its unusual programming, such as pairing a local choir, Alice Sings, with the famous Australian rock band Regurgitator to perform their song "Song Formally Known As" in 2018, while in 2017 jazz/funk band Hiatus Kaiyote invited Kardajala Kirri-darra (Sandhill Women) to sing with them.

Vice suggested in 2015 that WOS was perhaps "Australia’s best-kept festival secret", calling the location "breathtaking" and the festival an "honest, real and bullshit-free Central Desert experience".

Its artistic director Scott Large sees the festival as a "community-generated event that wanted to promote and foster local talent" which helps keep Indigenous languages alive.

References 

2009 establishments in Australia
Music festivals in Australia
Festivals in the Northern Territory